Asadabad-e Darband (also Romanized as Asadābād-e Darband; also known as Asadābād and Darband) is a village in Karat Rural District, in the Central District of Taybad County, Razavi Khorasan Province, Iran. At the 2006 census, its population was 2,057, in 429 families.

See also 

 List of cities, towns and villages in Razavi Khorasan Province

References 

Populated places in Taybad County